Table tennis competition has been in the Universiade since 2001, with singles, doubles and team events for both men and women.

Events

Editions

Medal table 
Last updated after the 2019 Summer Universiade

References 
ITTF Database

 
Sports at the Summer Universiade
Universiade